Oliver Marach and Philipp Oswald were the defending champions but chose not to defend their title.

Wesley Koolhof and Matwé Middelkoop won the title after defeating Andre Begemann and Jérémy Chardy 2–6, 6–4, [16–14] in the final.

Seeds

Draw

References
 Main Draw

Open du Pays d'Aix - Doubles
2017 Doubles